The 1978 East Coast Conference men's basketball tournament was held February 27 – March 4, 1978.  The champion gained and an automatic berth to the NCAA tournament.

Bracket and results

* denotes overtime game

References

East Coast Conference (Division I) men's basketball tournament
Tournament